The Church of St. Eugene is a former Roman Catholic parish church under the authority of the Roman Catholic Archdiocese of New York, located at Ogden Avenue at 163rd Street in Bronx, New York City. The parish is now closed.

References 

Closed churches in the Roman Catholic Archdiocese of New York
Closed churches in New York City
Roman Catholic churches in the Bronx